Mario Levi (February 25, 1957 in Istanbul) is a modern novelist of Turkish literature.

Biography

Levi graduated from Saint Michel High School in 1975, from Istanbul University the Faculty of Literature French Language and Literature Department in 1980. His first articles were published in the newspaper "Şalom". These were followed by his other articles in the publication organs like "Cumhuriyet", "Studyo Imge", "Milliyet Sanat", "Gosteri", "Argos", "Gergedan", "Varlik".

His first published book was "Jacques Brel: A Lonely Man" (1986). This book is a novelized version of his university graduation thesis. His first book of short stories, "Not Being Able to Go to a City" was published in 1990. These autobiographical stories are an account of the writer with both his loves, his childhood and preteen years. The book won the Haldun Taner Story Prize of the year. His second book of short stories, "Madame Floridis May Not Return" published in 1991, includes people in Istanbul who are having difficulty in adapting to their own minority group and to society. In 1992, his first novel, "Our Best Love Story," was published. Then a long silence took place. His 800-page novel, "Istanbul Was a Fairy Tale", published in 1999, is the story of a Jewish family who lived in Istanbul between the 1920s and 1980s. The heroes of the other minorities in the city are also seen in this novel.

Mario Levi, in addition to being a writer, has also been a French teacher, an importer, a journalist, a radio programmer and a copywriter. He is still giving lectures at Yeditepe University. He also teaches creative writing to the people who have set their hearts on trying to express their thoughts.

Levi's latest novel "Where Were You When Darkness Fell?" was published in January 2009, which has received very good reviews.

Levi's fiction questions myths about Turkish benevolence during the Holocaust, which he compares to the Armenian genocide.

Reception
Historian Marc David Baer states that Levi "creates characters that are far more believable than the stereotypical tolerant Turks, grateful Jews, and anti-Semitic Armenians and Greeks long propagated by historians."

Bibliography

Jacques Brel: A Lonely Man (Jacques Brel: Bir Yalnız Adam) (1986), biography.

Not Being Able to Go to a City (Bir Şehre Gidememek), 1990, stories.

Madame Floridis May Not Return (Madam Floridis Dönmeyebilir), 1991, stories.

Our Best Love Story (En Güzel Aşk Hikayemiz), 1992, novel.

Istanbul Was a Fairy Tale (İstanbul Bir Masaldı), 1999, novel.

Amusement Park Closed (Lunapark Kapandı), 2005, novel.

It Was a Summer Rain (Bir yaz Yağmuruydu), 2005, novel.

Where Were You When Darkness Fell (Karanlık Çökerken Neredeydiniz?), 2009, novel.

Works in the other Languages

Istanbul war ein Märchen (İstanbul bir Masaldı)
Suhrkamp Verlag  2008 – Germany – [www.suhrkamp.de]

Wo wart ihr, als die Finsternis hereinbrach? (Karanlık Çökerken Neredeydiniz?)
Suhrkamp Verlag  2011 – Germany – [www.suhrkamp.de]
 
Istanbul era una favola (İstanbul bir Masaldı)
Baldini Castoldi Dalai editore  2007 – Italy [www.bcdeditore.it]

La nostra più bella storia d'amore (En Güzel Aşk Hikayemiz)
Baldini Castoldi Dalai editore  2008 – Italy [www.bcdeditore.it]

External links
 Mario Levi Official Web site mariolevi.com.tr
Kalem Agency (copyright)

References 

1957 births
Writers from Istanbul
Turkish novelists
Turkish male short story writers
Living people
20th-century Turkish short story writers
20th-century Turkish male writers
21st-century Turkish short story writers
21st-century Turkish male writers